Hypatopa caedis is a moth in the family Blastobasidae. It is found in Costa Rica.

The length of the forewings is about 3.8 mm. The forewings are white intermixed with pale greyish-brown scales and greyish-brown scales tipped with pale greyish brown. The hindwings are translucent pale brown, gradually darkening towards the apex.

Etymology
The specific name is derived from Latin caedes (meaning a killing or slaughter).

References

Moths described in 2013
Hypatopa